The women's team sprint race of the 2015–16 ISU Speed Skating World Cup 4, arranged in the Thialf arena in Heerenveen, Netherlands, was held on 11 December 2015.

The Dutch team won the race, while the Russian team came second, and all other teams failed to start/finish or were disqualified.

Results
The race took place on Friday, 11 December, in the evening session, scheduled at 19:14.

References

Women team sprint
4